Nokia 1202 is a low-end GSM mobile phone made by Nokia under their Ultrabasic series, being aimed at first-time mobile phone users. It was announced in November 2008, and was released in April 2009. The phone was manufactured in Romania, India and china.

Hardware
Nokia 1202 has a  monochrome LCD display with a 96×68 pixel resolution, and an alphanumeric keypad with a dust-resistant keymat.
The battery lasts for up to nine hours of talk time, and 636 hours (29 days) of standby.

Software
The phone's system is equipped with call management timers and counters, device security (PIN code), predictive text input, a clock, analog clock display, a speaking alarm, picture messaging, and with several built-in games.

References
 http://www.gsmarena.com/nokia_1202-2573.php
 https://web.archive.org/web/20110823021804/http://nds1.nokia.com/phones/files/guides/Nokia_1202_UG_en.pdf
 http://europe.nokia.com/support/product-support/nokia-1202

External links
 Manufacturer link

1202